Love Music is the third studio album by Sérgio Mendes and Brasil '77. This is the first album to feature vocals by Gracinha Leporace and Bonnie Bowden.

Track listing
"Where Is the Love" (Ralph MacDonald, William Salter) 3:12
"Put a Little Love Away" (Brian Potter, Dennis Lambert) 3:15
"Don't Let Me Be Lonely Tonight" (James Taylor) 3:13
"Killing Me Softly with His Song" (Charles Fox, Norman Gimbel) 3:39
"Love Music" (Brian Potter, Dennis Lambert) 3:06
"You Can't Dress Up a Broken Heart" (Brian Potter, Dennis Lambert) 2:56
"Hey Look at the Sun" (Nelson Angelo) 3:59
"Walk the Way You Talk" (Burt Bacharach, Hal David) 3:29
"I Won't Last a Day Without You" (Paul Williams, Roger Nichols) 4:32
"I Can See Clearly Now" (Johnny Nash) 2:26

Personnel
Acoustic Guitar, Electric Guitar – Oscar Castro-Neves
Arranged By [Rhythm Section] – Bob Alcivar, Sérgio Mendes
Arranged By [Vocal Arrangements], Keyboards – Bob Alcivar
Art Direction – Beverly Weinstein
Bass – Sebastian Neto
Bongos, Congas, Percussion – Paulinho da Costa (Paulo Da Costa)
Congas, Triangle, Percussion – Laudir de Oliveira
Coordinator [Production Co-ordinator] – Pamela Vale
Design [Tepee Graphics] – David Larkham, Ron Wong
Drums – Claudio Slon
Electric Guitar, Rhythm Guitar, Twelve-String Guitar – Dennis Budimir
Engineer [Assistant] – Biff Dawes, Ed Barton, Ken Caillat, Terry Stark
Mastered By [Disc Mastering] – John Golden
Photography By – Ed Caraeff 
Piano, Electric Piano – Sérgio Mendes
Producer, Engineer, Sounds – Bones Howe
Vocals – Bonnie Bowden, Gracinha Leporace

References

1973 albums
Sérgio Mendes albums
Albums produced by Bones Howe
Bell Records albums